Dilip Kumar (11 December 1922 – 7 July 2021) was an Indian actor. He made his acting debut in 1944 with Jwar Bhata. The 1947 drama Jugnu opposite Noor Jehan was his first major success. Nadiya Ke Par was similarly that year's highest grossing Indian film. In 1949, he featured alongside Raj Kapoor in Mehboob Khan's Andaz opposite Nargis. This love triangle at the time of its release was the highest-grossing Indian film ever.

The 1950s saw Kumar in a number of popular films playing a variety of roles. Kumar won the first-ever Filmfare Award in the Best Actor category for his performance in 1954 release Daag. Two years later, Kumar played the titular character in the drama Azaad, which earned him his second Filmfare Best Actor Award. His titular role in Devdas (1955) earned him his third Filmfare Best Actor Award. Some of these films established his screen image as the "Tragedy King" because of his ill-fated characters in films. He also appeared alongside Dev Anand in Insaniyat (1955). Nine of Kumar's films were among the Top 30 highest-grossing films of the decade.

In 1960, Kumar appeared in K. Asif's big-budget epic historical film Mughal-e-Azam. He played Mughal Prince Salim, who falls in love with Anarkali (a court dancer, played by  Madhubala), and later revolts against his father Akbar (Prithviraj Kapoor). The film was successful at the box office earning a net revenue of 55  million (US$11,530,000).The film became the highest-grossing Indian film of all time. He played dual roles in the drama film Ram Aur Shyam (1967) which earned him his sixth Filmfare Award for Best Actor.

In 1981, Dilip Kumar appeared in historical drama Kranti, in the role of a revolutionary fighting for India's independence from British rule. He collaborated with director Subhash Ghai in films Vidhaata (1982), action film Karma, and Saudagar. He made his last film appearance in Qila. His two films Aag Ka Dariya and Kalinga are completed but remain unreleased. 

In total, Kumar worked as a lead in  57 films, Also he was doing many cameo/guest appearances and  many unreleased films in his 54 years film career.He was most choosy and selective actor at that time.He earned 19 nominations for best actor at the Filmfare Awards in his career, winning 8, three of them back to back (which is a record in itself). He received the Filmfare Lifetime Achievement Award in 1994.

Films

References

Indian filmographies
Male actor filmographies